Transcriptional memory is a biological phenomenon, initially discovered in yeast, during which cells primed with a particular cue show increased rates of gene expression after re-stimulation at a later time. This event was shown to take place: in yeast during growth in galactose and inositol starvation; plants during environmental stress; in mammalian cells during LPS and interferon induction. Prior work has shown that certain characteristics of chromatin may contribute to the poised transcriptional state that allows for faster re-induction. These include: activity of specific transcription factors, retention of RNA polymerase II at the promoters of poised genes, activity of chromatin remodeling complexes, propagation of H3K4me2 and H3K36me3 histone modifications, occupancy of the H3.3 histone variant, as well as binding of nuclear pore components. Moreover, locally bound cohesin was shown to inhibit establishment of transcriptional memory in human cells during interferon gamma stimulation.

References

Cells
Microbiology
Gene therapy